The 1926 U.S. National Championships (now known as the US Open) was a tennis tournament that took place on the outdoor grass courts at the West Side Tennis Club, Forest Hills in New York City, United States. The women's tournament was held from August 16 until August 23 while the men's tournament ran from 13 September until 18 September. It was the 46th staging of the U.S. National Championships and the fourth Grand Slam tennis event of the year.

Champions

Men's singles

 René Lacoste defeated  Jean Borotra  6–4, 6–0, 6–4

Women's singles

 Molla Bjurstedt Mallory defeated  Elizabeth Ryan  4–6, 6–4, 9–7

Men's doubles
 Richard Norris Williams /  Vincent Richards defeated  Bill Tilden /  Alfred Chapin 6–4, 6–8, 11–9, 6–3

Women's doubles
 Elizabeth Ryan /  Eleanor Goss defeated  Mary K. Browne /  Charlotte Chapin 3–6, 6–4, 12–10

Mixed doubles
 Elizabeth Ryan /  Jean Borotra defeated  Hazel Hotchkiss Wightman /  René Lacoste 6–4, 7–5

References

External links
Official US Open website

 
U.S. National Championships
U.S. National Championships (tennis) by year
U.S. National Championships
U.S. National Championships
U.S. National Championships
U.S. National Championships